Chemung is a town in Chemung County, New York, United States. The population was 2,368 at the 2020 census. The town name is derived from the Chemung River, which means "Big Horn" in the native language.

The town is in the southeast corner of the county and is southeast of Elmira. It is part of the Elmira Metropolitan Statistical Area.

History 
The region was destroyed by the Sullivan Expedition on August 13, 1779, which fought at the Battle of Newtown, just west of the current town of Chemung.

The first clear record of settlement dates to about 1786.

The town of Chemung was established in 1788 as the original town in the region. Chemung lost territory when Tioga County was formed in 1791. The town of Newtown (now the town of Elmira) was taken from Chemung in 1792. Chemung was incorporated in 1788 into Montgomery County, at the time of that town's formation. (Chemung County was not created until 1836.) Subsequently, the town of Chemung lost more territory to form all or parts of Erin (1822), Baldwin (1856), and Ashland (1867).

The Chemung District School No. 10, Dr. Hovey Everett House, and Riverside Cemetery are listed on the National Register of Historic Places.

Geography
The Chemung River, a tributary of the Susquehanna River, flows through the south part of the town.

The south border of the town is Pennsylvania (Bradford County), and the east border is Tioga County.

The Southern Tier Expressway (Interstate 86 and New York State Route 17) and New York State Route 427 are east-west highways in Chemung.

Demographics

As of the census of 2000, there were 2,665 people, 969 households, and 749 families residing in the town.  The population density was 53.9 people per square mile (20.8/km2).  There were 1,054 housing units at an average density of 21.3 per square mile (8.2/km2).  The racial makeup of the town was 97.64% White, 0.53% African American, 0.26% Native American, 0.19% Asian, 0.45% from other races, and 0.94% from two or more races. Hispanic or Latino of any race were 0.83% of the population.

There were 969 households, out of which 36.9% had children under the age of 18 living with them, 64.2% were married couples living together, 7.2% had a female householder with no husband present, and 22.7% were non-families. 17.2% of all households were made up of individuals, and 7.6% had someone living alone who was 65 years of age or older.  The average household size was 2.71 and the average family size was 3.03.

In the town, the population was spread out, with 28.0% under the age of 18, 6.8% from 18 to 24, 29.3% from 25 to 44, 23.5% from 45 to 64, and 12.4% who were 65 years of age or older.  The median age was 37 years. For every 100 females, there were 101.9 males.  For every 100 females age 18 and over, there were 99.7 males.

The median income for a household in the town was $35,167, and the median income for a family was $37,885. Males had a median income of $29,844 versus $22,958 for females. The per capita income for the town was $15,201.  About 8.5% of families and 11.7% of the population were below the poverty line, including 15.9% of those under age 18 and 1.1% of those age 65 or over.

Communities and locations in the Town of Chemung 
Beantown – A hamlet in the northwestern part of the town on County Road 3.
Chemung – The hamlet of Chemung is located near the southern town line. The community is adjacent to the Southern Tier Expressway and the Chemung River.
Mallory Creek – A stream flowing past Owens Mills into Wynkoop Creek.
Owens Mills – A hamlet near the center of the town on County Road 23.
Wynkoop Creek – A stream on the western side of town flowing past Bean Town and entering the Chemung River near Chemung village.

Notable people
1986 Daytona 500 champion Geoffrey Bodine, Brett Bodine, and NASCAR Craftsman Truck champion Todd Bodine, all NASCAR drivers.
Wells Spicer, judge who presided over preliminary hearing to see if Virgil, Wyatt, and Morgan Earp as well as Doc Holliday would stand trial for murder following the Gunfight at the O.K. Corral; also was defense attorney for John D. Lee in his trial for his involvement in the Mountain Meadows massacre.
Joseph C. Patituce, the managing partner of a large defense firm in Ohio, the lead defense attorney in the 100 million dollar theft involving a fake Navy Veterans Charity.  Lead trial counsel in the Michael Martin murder trial. Lead trial counsel in the Trevin Biles, brother of Simone Biles, triple murder case which ended in an acquittal on ALL charges and made international news.  Defense Attorney Joseph Patituce obtains Acquittal for Tevin Biles.  Patituce's work has been followed by CNN, ESPN, FOX, People, and other major networks. All murder charges against Biles dropped NY Times- Patituce gets acquittal for Biles

References

External links
 Town of Chemung official website
 Tri-Counties Genealogy & History: Town of Chemung, Chemung County NY

Populated places established in 1786
Towns in Chemung County, New York